The French destroyer Sakalave was one of a dozen s built for the French Navy in Japan during the First World War.

Design and description
The ships displaced  at normal load. They were powered by three vertical triple-expansion steam engines, each driving one propeller shaft using steam provided by four mixed-firing Kampon Yarrow-type boilers. During their sea trials, the Arabe class reached . Their crew consisted of 5 officers and 104 crewmen.

The main armament of the Arabe-class ships was a single Type 41  gun, mounted before the bridge on the forecastle. Their secondary armament consisted of four Type 41  guns in single mounts; two of these were positioned abreast the middle funnel and the others were on the centerline further aft. One of these latter guns was on a high-angle mount and served as an anti-aircraft gun. The ships carried two above-water twin mounts for  torpedo tubes. In 1917–18, a rack for eight  depth charges was added.

Construction and career
Sakalave was ordered from Maizuru Naval Arsenal and was launched in 1917 and was completed on 9 November of that year. During the Russian Civil War on 9 March 1921 she damaged the Soviet  at Anapa in the Black Sea and caused the ship to be beached and abandoned.

Citations

References

External links
naval-history.net

1917 ships
Arabe-class destroyers
Ships built by Maizuru Naval Arsenal